Jonathan McEvoy (born 2 August 1989 in St Helens, Merseyside) is a British former racing cyclist. As well as an accomplished road rider he is also a specialist in cyclo-cross and those skills almost certainly helped him obtain a top 100 finish at the 2014 Paris–Roubaix.

Major results

2006
 3rd Road race, National Junior Road Championships
2007
 1st Overall Junior Tour of Wales
 2nd Road race, National Junior Road Championships
2009
 10th La Côte Picarde
2010
 3rd Newport Nocturne
 4th Clayton Velo Spring Classic
 7th East Yorkshire Classic
2011
 3rd Mumbai Cyclothon II
 4th Rutland–Melton CiCLE Classic
 4th East Yorkshire Classic
2012
 1st Overall Tour Doon Hame
1st Stage 3
 3rd Tour du Finistère
 6th Overall Baltic Chain Tour
 6th Geoff Bewley Memorial Cross
2015
 1st Hitter Road Race
 2nd Wales Open Criterium
 4th Circuit race, National Road Championships
 4th Beaumont Trophy
 4th Stafford GP
 6th Grand Prix of Wales
2016
 6th Chorley Grand Prix
2017
 5th Rutland–Melton CiCLE Classic
 8th Beaumont Trophy

References

External links

1989 births
Living people
British male cyclists